The first elections to the newly created Leeds City Council were held on 10 May 1973, with the entirety of the 96 seat council – three seats for each of the 32 wards – up for vote. The Local Government Act 1972 stipulated that the elected members were to shadow and eventually take over from the predecessor corporation on 1 April 1974. The order in which the councillors were elected dictated their term serving, with third-place candidates serving two years and up for re-election in 1975, second-placed three years expiring in 1976 and 1st-placed five years until 1978.

As well as replacing the County Borough of Leeds, the new council included:
Municipal Borough of Morley
Municipal Borough of Pudsey
Aireborough Urban District
Horsforth Urban District
Otley Urban District
Garforth Urban District
Rothwell Urban District
Tadcaster Rural District (part)
Wetherby Rural District
Wharfedale Rural District

The election resulted in no overall control.

Election result

This result has the following consequences for the total number of seats on the council after the elections:

Ward results

By-elections between 1973 and 1975

References

1973 English local elections
1973
1970s in Leeds